31 minutos, la película is an 2008 Chiliean puppet film based on the Chilean puppet television show 31 minutos, directed by Álvaro Díaz and Pedro Peirano. The film premiere for the public had been scheduled since late 2006, but was delayed for several improvements in its post-production phase, including conducting a contest to find the voices of some characters. The film premiered in Chile on March 27, 2008, in Brazil it was released on August 3, 2012.

Plot

On a remote island, a rare creature known as the Blonde Buffalo attempts to flee in an escape raft but is stopped by the island's owner Cachirula and her assistant Wool Star. Cachirula grieves that she is both despised by the rare creatures she keeps on the island and that she is still missing the most valuable animal of all: the Juanín. A smuggler named Tío Pelado arrives to console Cachirula that he has encountered the last remaining Juanín in existence, and promises to bring it to her.

In mainland Chile, Juanín is the producer of the news program 31 Minutos, headed by bumbling anchor Tulio Triviño, who is celebrating his birthday. Juanín has arranged a gift for Tulio, but fears he will be fired if anything goes wrong. Tío Pelado overhears this and plans to vandalize Juanín's gift, a portrait of Tulio. The program begins a live broadcasting of the celebration, culminating in the unveiling of Tulio's portrait, which Tío Pelado has repainted to display Tulio sitting on a toilet. Tulio, upset by the humiliating image, fires Juanín. After his departure, the news crew finds security footage of Tío Pelado altering Tulio's portrait, which proves Juanín is innocent. Just as they find him, Juanín has already been tricked by Tío Pelado to come to Cachirula's island.

Captive on Tío Pelado's shipping boat, Juanín befriends a bug named Vicho who warns him about the cruel nature of Cachirula's rare animal collection. At the docks, a guilt-ridden Tulio rallies the cast to rescue Juanín by using his private yacht to pursue the boat. Feeling betrayed and unaware of his friends' rescue attempt, Juanín accepts Cachirula's hospitality upon arrival to the island and is instructed that he never has to work again. While stuck at sea, the crew watch a broadcast of Cachirula announcing her completed animal collection and Juanín's disgust of his friends; but Juan Carlos Bodoque, a journalist within the crew, protests the true intentions of Cachirula are to fill her private zoo and strip the animals of their freedom. To keep Juanín from his friends' rescue, Cachirula disposes of Tío Pelado as the only remaining witness.

During a storm, Juan Carlos is thrown overboard and lost at sea, after which the boat is swallowed by a whale where they find Tío Pelado. Upon exiting the whale, they land on Cachirula's island. Meanwhile, Juan Carlos is captured by a tribe of Huachimingos and want to kill him because they believe he is Tío Pelado and kidnapped the Huachimingo that is in Cachirula's collection. The Huachimingos set him free after proving his identity and could lead them to the missing Huachimingo.

Bored of his new lifestyle, Juanín attempts to make his own show by recording the other animals but is reprimanded by Cachirula. Cachirula reminds Juanín of his friends' abandonment just as Wool Star discovers the crew on their beach. Tulio arrives at Cachirula's doorstep and unsuccessfully tries to convince Juanín to return to the studio with him. As Tulio returns to the beach and informs the rest of the crew, Juan Carlos arrives with the Huachimingos. Juanín, moved by Tulio's apology, explores an off-limits area to find the mounted head of the Blonde Buffalo, convincing him of Cachirula's evil intentions and sparking him to incite revolt among the other animals. As Cachirula detains Juanín, she informs him that she has decided to decapitate and mount all the animals' heads. The Huachimingo escapes and informs the crew of Cachirula's plans.

After Cachirula refuses to release the animals, the crew declares war and a battle ensues between the news crew, aided by the species that suffered Cachirula's kidnappings, and Cachirula's army of dolls; while Tulio and Juan Carlos go to save Juanín. Cachirula releases an army of robots to defeat the crew, but the battle ends up being won by the crew after Vicho arrives with help. They arrive in time to save Juanín and release the remaining animals, but Cachirula re-captures Juanin and throws him off a cliff. Tulio jumps to save Juanín, and both are saved by the whale that swallowed them earlier. Vowing revenge, Cachirula and Wool Star flee in their hovercraft, but it malfunctions and explodes.

As the characters celebrate their victory over Cachirula, Juan Carlos expresses his interest in staying with the Huachimingos, but he quickly regrets it upon learning that their spots are tattoos.

Characters

 Juanín Juan Harry – A white, fluffy creature, the only one of his kind. Producer of 31 Minutos
 Tulio Triviño Tufillo – The narcissistic conductor and lead anchor of 31 Minutos
 Juan Carlos Bodoque – A red rabbit with a gambling problem. A popular journalist on 31 Minutos.
 Patricia Ana "Patana" Tufillo Triviño – Tulio's niece and a young reporter
 Ernesto Felipe Mario Hugo – An awkward chihuahua and reporter in love with Patana
 Policarpo Avendaño – A news commentator
 Balón Von Bola – Talking soccer ball with a hearing problem. Works as a sports commentator
 Cachirula – Selfish millionaire and collector of rare animals
 Tío Pelado – Smuggler and conman working for Cachirula
 Wool Star – Cachirula's assistant
 Huachimingo – A spotted animal abducted for Cachirula's zoo
 Vicho – A lone bug living on Tío Pelado's ship.

References

External links
  
 

2008 films
2008 animated films
Brazilian animated films
Films shot in Chile
Films shot in Rio de Janeiro (city)
Puppet films
Chilean comedy films
Chilean animated films
2008 comedy films
2000s Spanish-language films
Films with live action and animation
Brazilian comedy films
Films based on television series
Muppet parodies